Archaeomanta is an extinct genus of eagle ray that lived from the Cretaceous to the middle Neogene. It is one of the oldest known manta ray relatives. It is known from North Africa, the Middle East, the U.K., the U.S., and Uzbekistan.

References 

Myliobatidae
Fossil taxa described in 1987
Cretaceous fish of Europe
Ray genera
Taxa named by Henri Cappetta